Simon Rastorguev (Russian: Семён Васи́льевич Расторгу́ев; born in 1981 in the city of Yaroslavl) is a Russian architect.

He graduated from Yaroslavl State Technical University. Aspirant of Department of Cultural and journalism, YSPU.
Architect in architectural office "Project Meganom", Moscow. Curator of Architecture Festival "Social Revolution" and organizer of international architectural competitions.
Editor of the website on the conceptual architecture - "Center of Exploring the Chaos".

Major publications 
 "Real architecture is unpredictable." — Tatlin Mono magazine.
 "Dreams and Visions: BioCity" — l`ARCA plus 
 "Kotorosl 2010. Yaroslavl Millennium." — Domus magazine.
 "Anti-Conditionalism - Arquitectura despuses del comunismo." — Codigo 06140.
 "Contemporary intervention in Laguna." — Project Russia.
 "Visions of a Mutant City" — ARC-vision.
 "Agora, Dreams and Visions, Bio-City" — l`ARCA 
 "Build das architekten - magazin" — cover page 
 Other publications 2007—2014

Awards 

 2002 — Winner of international architectural competition "Atlas on architecture of the Future" 
 2002 — Special Participant of XXI International Congress of Architects in Berlin
 2004 — Winner of the Russian architectural competition "Workshop Russia" 
 2004 — Participant of international master-class led by the Dutch team of architects "West 8" in the IX Venice Biennale
 2005 — Winner of the AllRussian competition "Five facades private Architecture"
 2005 — Winner of an international competition Advanced Architecture Contest
 2008 — Longlister of the Russian architectural competition, "Dom-Avtonom"
 2009 — Winner of World Architecture Community Awards 
 2014 — Longlister of the Foundation Jacques Rougerie competition

Curatorial work 

 Curator of Architecture Festival "Social Revolution" (2012—2014)
Organizer of international architectural competitions:
 "The revolution of social housing" (2012), (competition website)
 "Architecture & Food" (2013), (competitive projects)
 "PARKing" (2013), (competitive projects)
 "Spartacus alive" within 1st Yaroslavl Architecture Biennale (2013), (competition website)
 "Under the Bridge" (2014), (competition website)

Exhibitions 

 2002 – 2004 — The exhibition in TSSI "ARS-Forum" "Young city"
 2003 — The Author Exhibition NMAXU
 2004 – 2008 — International Exhibition of Architecture and Design "Arch Moscow"
 2004, 2008 — International Architecture Biennale, Venice
 2008 — "Persimfance" exhibition, Moscow
 2009 — Architectural Festival "Golden chapiter", Novosibirsk
 2010 — "New Formalism" exhibition, St. Petersburg
 2011 — "Guilty Money" exhibition, Moscow
 2014 — First Jacques Rougerie Foundation Exhibition in the National School of Architecture Paris-Val-de-Seine, Paris

Some realized projects 

 2005 — Hotel "Tsargrad", Yaroslavl (co-author of Tonino Guerra)
 2006 — Spa-salon, Yaroslavl
 2007 — Project Meganom pavilion at the Arch Moscow exhibition, Moscow
 2007 — Second Moscow Biennale of Contemporary Art exposition, Moscow
 2008 — Exposition space of the Persimfans exhibition, 1 Moscow Architecture Biennale, Moscow
 2008 — Exposition space "BornHouse" at the Venice Biennale - San Stae, Venice, 2008

Major projects 

 2002 — "Anticonditionalism - vertical city" for the international competition, the Atlas architecture future ", Berlin
 2002 — BioCity - project for the international competition, the Atlas architecture future", Berlin
 2002 — Modern cottage at Rublevka, Moscow
 2003 – 2004 — Millennium Center of Yaroslavl, Yaroslavl
 2004 — Laguna Proun, Venice
 2005 — Cottage village "Ogorodnik sleep", 5 facades private architecture Russia competition, Moscow, Advanced Architecture Contest, Barcelona
 2005 — The reconstruction project Volkova square, Yaroslavl
 2005 – 2006 — Central complex and business center in the flood plain of the river Kotorosl, Yaroslavl
 2007 – 2008 — Multifunktional complex «Borovoye-Biocity», Borovoye, Kazakhstan
 2007 – 2009 — Self-sustaining houses projects, «Dom-Avtonom» competition, Moscow
 list of architectural projects 2000—2014

References

External links 
 Simon Rastorguev all projects
 Architect page on the World Architecture Community
 A documentary film about the architect
 Who is who, CCA
 "30-year-olds. Simon Rastorguev" — Russia's cultural heritage portal
 Simon Rastorguev architect on edilportale.com
 Simon Rastorguev on archiportale.com

1981 births
Living people
People from Yaroslavl
Russian architects
Landscape architects